Jan Zoulík (born 2 February 1957) is a Czech gymnast. He competed at the 1976 Summer Olympics and the 1980 Summer Olympics.

References

1957 births
Living people
Czech male artistic gymnasts
Olympic gymnasts of Czechoslovakia
Gymnasts at the 1976 Summer Olympics
Gymnasts at the 1980 Summer Olympics
Gymnasts from Prague